Elwin Norris Hermanson (born August 22, 1952) was a Canadian politician, best known for being the first full-time leader of the Saskatchewan Party.

In 1993 he was elected as a Reform Member of Parliament in the Saskatchewan riding of Kindersley—Lloydminster. He was the Reform Party House Leader from 1993 until 1995. Due to redistribution his hometown was located in the new constituency of Saskatoon—Rosetown—Biggar for the 1997 election.  He ran against fellow incumbent Chris Axworthy of the New Democratic Party for the new seat and lost.

Hermanson sought the leadership of the newly founded Saskatchewan Party in 1998, and defeated Rod Gantefoer and Yogi Huyghebaert in a one member one vote election. He was elected to the provincial legislature for Rosetown-Biggar in the 1999 provincial election and became Leader of the Opposition.  The new party won a small plurality of the popular vote, but was almost nonexistent outside rural areas. It was completely shut out in Regina and won only one seat in Saskatoon. Ultimately, this left the Saskatchewan Party five seats short of making Hermanson Premier. He did, however, reduce the Saskatchewan New Democratic Party to a minority government.

Hermanson was widely expected to lead the party to victory in 2003.  However, he came up short again in the provincial election that November, in which the NDP actually won a bare majority. While the Saskatchewan Party scored a net gain of two seats, both in Saskatoon, it was shut out of Regina once again (though it came within a few hundred votes of taking a Regina seat). Believing he had taken the party as far as he could, Hermanson resigned days after the election and was subsequently succeeded by Brad Wall. Hermanson remained the MLA for the new constituency of Rosetown-Elrose.

On Friday, June 23, 2006, Hermanson announced that he would not be seeking re-election to the legislature.

External links

Canadian people of Swedish descent
Members of the House of Commons of Canada from Saskatchewan
Reform Party of Canada MPs
Saskatchewan Party MLAs
1952 births
Living people
Saskatchewan political party leaders
21st-century Canadian politicians
People from Swift Current